Elderslie may refer to one of the following locations:

 Elderslie, Scotland, a village in Renfrewshire, west central Scotland
 Elderslie, New South Wales, a suburb of Sydney, Australia
 Elderslie, Tasmania, a rural locality in Tasmania, Australia